Brighton High School is a high school in Brighton, Tennessee. It one of three high schools in Tipton County; the others are Covington High School and Munford High School.

History

Campus
Brighton's campus consists of the main school building, parking lot, football field, practice field, a weight room, and a track. Additions to the school in the 2007-2008 school year gave the campus a new tennis court and another wing to the building, that includes around 7 new classrooms, a band/ choir room, and a more improved shop for the school's Agricultural Program. The main building consists of 6 main hallways, a cafeteria, an atrium, a library, a greenhouse, and a shop. The field-house is where the weights are located for use by the school's athletic teams.

Curriculum
Additional courses are available to Brighton students through the Tennessee Technology Center at Covington and Dyersburg State Community College. However, the school only has half the state average AP course participation at 5%. This may stem from the fact that the school uses an unweighted GPA, discouraging students from taking more challenging honors, AP, and dual enrollment classes.

References

Public high schools in Tennessee
Schools in Tipton County, Tennessee